Wooroora was an electoral district of the House of Assembly in the Australian colony (state from 1901) of South Australia.

The electorate was created by the Electoral Districts Act 1872 of the South Australian parliament but it was not until the provincial election of 1875 that candidates were first elected to represent Woorooroo. The electorate stretched from Gulf St Vincent in the west to Riverton in the east, spanning the central and northern Adelaide Plains from the River Light in the south to Hoyleton and Auburn north of the Wakefield River, in the north.

The structure of the parliament was changed and its membership reduced by the Constitution Act Amendment Act, 1901. The new Wooroora district elected three members and comprised the former Wooroora and Light districts.

The chief polling place was listed as Riverton, with subsidiary polling places at Humphrey's Springs (now Alma), Stockport, Port Wakefield, Balaklava, Auburn, Rhynie, Watervale, Tarlee, and Hoyleton. The electorate boundaries were defined as lands including the whole of the Hundreds of Goyder, Stow, Hall, Inkerman, Balaklava, Dalkey, and Alma as well as parts of the Hundreds of Dublin, Grace, Light, Gilbert, Upper Wakefield and Stanley. The number of members was set at two.

Members

References

External links
The 13 electorates from 1902 to 1915: The Adelaide Chronicle

Former electoral districts of South Australia
1875 establishments in Australia
1938 disestablishments in Australia